Kamieniec may refer to several places:

Poland
Kamieniec, Gmina Kłecko in Greater Poland Voivodeship (west-central Poland)
Kamieniec, Gmina Trzemeszno in Greater Poland Voivodeship (west-central Poland)
Kamieniec, Grodzisk Wielkopolski County in Greater Poland Voivodeship (west-central Poland)
Kamieniec, Aleksandrów County in Kuyavian-Pomeranian Voivodeship (north-central Poland)
Kamieniec, Radziejów County in Kuyavian-Pomeranian Voivodeship (north-central Poland)
Kamieniec, Toruń County in Kuyavian-Pomeranian Voivodeship (north-central Poland)
Kamieniec, Lesser Poland Voivodeship (south Poland)
Kamieniec, Łódź Voivodeship (central Poland)
Kamieniec, Lower Silesian Voivodeship (south-west Poland)
Kamieniec Wrocławski in Lower Silesian Voivodeship
Kamieniec Ząbkowicki in Lower Silesian Voivodeship (German Camentz)
Kamieniec, Gostynin County in Masovian Voivodeship (east-central Poland)
Kamieniec, Siedlce County in Masovian Voivodeship (east-central Poland)
Kamieniec, Pomeranian Voivodeship (north Poland)
Kamieniec, Silesian Voivodeship (south Poland)
Kamieniec, Kielce County in Świętokrzyskie Voivodeship (south-central Poland)
Kamieniec, Opatów County in Świętokrzyskie Voivodeship (south-central Poland)
Kamieniec, Sandomierz County in Świętokrzyskie Voivodeship (south-central Poland)
Kamieniec, Staszów County in Świętokrzyskie Voivodeship (south-central Poland)
Kamieniec, Warmian-Masurian Voivodeship (north Poland)
Kamieniec, West Pomeranian Voivodeship (north-west Poland)

Historical name in other places
Kamianets-Podilskyi, Ukraine
Kamyanyets, Belarus

See also
Kamieniec Castle
Kamenets (disambiguation)